Taanakkaran is a 2022 Indian Tamil-language period drama film written and directed by Tamizh in his directorial debut and produced by Potential Studios. The film stars Vikram Prabhu in the lead role with Anjali Nair, Madhusudhan Rao, Lal, Livingston, and M. S. Bhaskar in supporting roles. The film is based on real life incidents from 1997 related to police training. The film released directly on Disney+ Hotstar on 8 April 2022. The film received positive reviews from both critics and audiences.

Plot
The plot is set in 1999. Arivu is a young cop who just got selected in the Tamil Nadu Police and is sent to the PRS (Police Recruit School) for training. He is joined by a few of his friends and soon befriends other trainees. A few among them are older policemen, who cleared their interviews in 1982, but due to political reasons, could not get placed till date. Most of the trainers see them as unfit old men and mock them. However, Arivu motivates them.

The PRS is run by Inspector Muthupandi, a stern but corrupt officer who is feared by all. One of his aides is Eshwaramurthy, a very strict and ruthless trainer, who has a record of winning all the parades and even resulting in the deaths of a few trainees in the name of very hard training (Extra Drill called as ED). On the very first day of training, one of Arivu's friend from the '82 batch faces the wrath of Muthupandi after he complains about the lack of toilet facilities in the campus. Soon, Easwara Moorthy starts seeing Arivu as a rival and warns him that he will not allow him to pass the training. He follows many tactics to brutally punish and demotivate Arivu and his batch.

How Arivu manages to win against all these odds forms the rest of the story.

Cast

 Vikram Prabhu as Arivazhagan (Arivu)
 Anjali Nair as Eeshwari
 Madhusudhan Rao as Muthupandi
 Lal as Eshwaramurthy
 Livingston as Rajendran, Arivu's father
 M. S. Bhaskar as Sellakkanu
 Bose Venkat as Inspector Mathi
 Pavel Navageethan as Kadar Basha
 Nitish Veera as Counsellor Sahul Bhai
 Uday Mahesh as Nandhakumar
 Karthick Kannan as Murugan
 Lingesh as Arivu's friend

Satellite rights
The satellite rights of the movie were secured by Star Vijay.

Soundtrack
The soundtrack and score is composed by Ghibran.

Reception
M. Suganth of The Times of India gave 3.0 out of 5 stars and wrote "Vikram Prabhu comes up with a sturdy performance, capturing Arivu's physicality very well. MS Bhaskar shines as a veteran cop who is paying the price for an insubordination years ago, and Lal makes us hate his character. Bose Venkat, as Madhi, an honest cop who wants to turn the recruits into good policemen despite being aware of the system's flaws, pitches in with an empathetic performance. These performances hold the film together and keep us engaged." Navein Darshan from Cinema express gave 3.5 stars out of 5 stars said that "A powerful film about a lesser-known problem ' A Critic from The News Minute noted that "Lal in well-written roles is a phenomenal actor. His Yama raja in Karnan showed off the depth of his skill and ability for nuance. Unfortunately, nuance is exactly what’s missing in his characterization.".

However, Bhavana Sharma critic from Pinkvilla gave 3 out of 5 rating and well noted that " Vikram Prabhu got into the skin of the role and he has done an amazing job as Arivu. It has been a long time since we saw him and finally, seeing him in a powerful and intense role makes his fans proud and happier. On the whole, this film is definitely worth a watch this weekend.". Janani K from India Today gave 3 out of 5 rating and noted that "Taanakkaaran is an engaging cop drama that is refreshing to watch." A Critic from OTTPlay noted that "Watch it if you're a fan of realistic cop dramas that effectively address serious issues in society. " and gave 3 rating out of 5.

References

External links

2022 films
2022 drama films
Tamil-language Disney+ Hotstar original programming
2022 directorial debut films